Terje Bjarte Langli (born 3 February 1965 in Steinkjer) is a former Norwegian cross-country skier for Henning IL and a former skiing waxer for the Norwegian cross-country skiing national team. He won two medals at the 1992 Winter Olympics in Albertville with a gold in the 4 × 10 km relay and a bronze in the 30 km.

Langli's biggest successes were at the FIS Nordic World Ski Championships where he earned three gold medals (1991: 10 km, 4 × 10 km relay; 1993: 4 × 10 km relay) and one bronze medal 4 × 10 km relay: 1987.

He now works for Elbe Normark A.S in sales for Peltonen skis and Rex ski wax in Norway.

Cross-country skiing results
All results are sourced from the International Ski Federation (FIS).

Olympic Games
 2 medals – (1 gold, 1 bronze)

World Championships
 4 medals – (3 gold, 1 bronze)

World Cup

Season standings

Individual podiums
 2 victories  
 4 podiums

Team podiums
 7 victories 
 13 podiums 

Note: Until the 1999 World Championships and the 1994 Olympics, World Championship and Olympic races were included in the World Cup scoring system.

References

External links
 

Norwegian male cross-country skiers
Olympic cross-country skiers of Norway
Olympic gold medalists for Norway
Olympic bronze medalists for Norway
1965 births
Cross-country skiers at the 1988 Winter Olympics
Cross-country skiers at the 1992 Winter Olympics
Living people
Olympic medalists in cross-country skiing
FIS Nordic World Ski Championships medalists in cross-country skiing
Medalists at the 1992 Winter Olympics
People from Steinkjer
Sportspeople from Trøndelag